Sir Alun Talfan Davies  (22 July 1913 – 11 November 2000) was a Welsh judge, publisher and Liberal politician.

Background
Alun Talfan Davies was born at Gorseinon near Swansea, the youngest son of the Calvinistic Methodist minister William Talfan Davies (1873–1938) and his wife Alys, née Jones (1878–1948). He was the brother of Aneirin Talfan Davies. He was educated at Gowerton grammar school.  He read law at the University of Wales, Aberystwyth, and at Gonville and Caius College, Cambridge. In 1942, he married Eiluned Christopher Williams. He had one son and three daughters. In 1969 his daughter Janet married the Welsh Rugby international Barry John. He died at his home in Penarth on 1 November 2000.

Legal career
Davies entered Gray's Inn and qualified as a barrister just before the outbreak of World War II. As a barrister he specialised in industrial cases and was retained by the National Union of Mineworkers. He was appointed as a QC in 1961.

Davies was a counsel to the public enquiry into Aberfan tip disaster of 1966. From 1967 to 1990 he was Chairman of the Trustees of the Aberfan Fund, which allocated the money raised by public subscription following the disaster.

Davies sat as a recorder (a part-time circuit judge) from 1963 to 1972 and as a full-time circuit judge from 1972 to 1986.

Legal appointments:
Recorder of Merthyr Tydfil (1963–1968)
Recorder of Swansea (1969)
Recorder of Cardiff (1969–1971)
Honorary Recorder of Cardiff and Recorder of the Crown Court (1972–1986)
Criminal Injuries Compensation Board (1976–1985)
Court of Appeal, Jersey and Guernsey (1969–1983)

Political activity
During the 1930s, Davies had been a member of Plaid Cymru, but he left the party for the Liberal Party and became the chairman of the Liberal Party of Wales.

Davies stood four times for parliament without success. He was an independent candidate at the 1943 University of Wales by-election. At the 1959 general election he stood against Lady Megan Lloyd George in Carmarthen for the Liberals and again in 1964. In 1966 he switched to Denbigh but was once more unsuccessful.

Davies was a member of the Royal Commission on the Constitution from 1969 to 1973.

Electoral record

Cultural activities
In 1940, with his brother Aneirin Talfan Davies, Davies founded the Welsh language publishing firm  (later taken over by Sir Alun's son, Christopher Davies and taking his name). In 1958 they co-published , an influential Welsh dictionary. In 1969 they founded the current affairs magazine Barn.

With a group of friends and acquaintances Davies formed Harlech Television (later HTV) which made a successful bid for the Wales and West independent television franchise, displacing the incumbent TWW in 1967. Davies persuaded Lord Harlech to become chairman of HTV Group while Davies became vice-chairman. Davies was chairman of the Welsh board from 1967 to 1973.

Davies was an active supporter of the National Eisteddfod of Wales and was President of the Court from 1979 to 1982.

In 1980 he co-founded the Welsh Portrait Sculpture Trust which commissioned a series of portrait busts of distinguished Welshmen from the sculptor Ivor Roberts-Jones. In 1982 he became a trustee of the Welsh Sculpture Trust which established an outdoor sculpture collection in Margam Country Park.

Other appointments and honours
Knighted (1976)
Chairman of the Bank of Wales (1991–1995)

Publication

References

External links
 Portrait by John Elwyn in the collection of the National Library of Wales.

1913 births
2000 deaths
People from Gorseinon
Alumni of Aberystwyth University
Alumni of Gonville and Caius College, Cambridge
20th-century Welsh judges
Knights Bachelor
Members of Gray's Inn
Liberal Party (UK) parliamentary candidates
People educated at Gowerton Grammar School
Welsh King's Counsel